The 2022–23 Sydney Thunder Women's season was the eighth in the team's history. Coached by Trevor Griffin, the Thunder finished the regular season of WBBL08 in last place. After missing the entirety of WBBL07 due to family reasons, captain Rachael Haynes returned to the team in 2022–23 for her final season, having announced her impending retirement from professional cricket.

Squad 
Each 2022–23 squad was made up of 15 active players. Teams could sign up to five 'marquee players', with a maximum of three of those from overseas. Marquees were defined as any overseas player, or a local player who holds a Cricket Australia national contract at the start of the WBBL|08 signing period.

Personnel changes made ahead of the season included:

 English marquee Issy Wong departed the Thunder, signing with the Hobart Hurricanes.
 Indian marquees Smriti Mandhana and Deepti Sharma did not re-sign with the Thunder.
 English marquee Tammy Beaumont returned to the Thunder after a season's absence.
 English marquee Amy Jones signed with the Thunder, having previously played for the Sydney Sixers and Perth Scorchers.
 South African marquee Chloe Tryon signed with the Thunder, having previously played for the Hobart Hurricanes.
 New Zealand marquee Lea Tahuhu signed with the Thunder as a replacement player, having previously played for the Melbourne Renegades.
 Kate Peterson departed the Thunder, signing with the Sydney Sixers.
 Belinda Vakarewa returned to the Thunder, departing the Hobart Hurricanes.
 Saskia Horley returned to the Thunder as a replacement player. Horley was approved as a local signing due to her permanent residence in Australia, despite having recently played international cricket for Scotland.

The table below lists the Thunder players and their key stats (including runs scored, batting strike rate, wickets taken, economy rate, catches and stumpings) for the season.

Ladder

Fixtures 

All times are AEDT.

Statistics and awards 
 Most runs: Phoebe Litchfield – 280 (16th in the league)
 Highest score in an innings: Tammy Beaumont – 77* (59) vs Perth Scorchers, 22 October November 2022
 Most wickets: Samantha Bates – 12 (equal 18th in the league)
 Best bowling figures in an innings: Lauren Smith – 5/17 (4 overs) vs Perth Scorchers, 22 October 2022
 Most catches (fielder): Samantha Bates, Rachael Haynes, Olivia Porter, Chloe Tryon – 4 each (equal 31st in the league)
 Player of the Match awards: Lauren Smith – 1

References

Further reading

 

2022–23 Women's Big Bash League season by team
Sydney Thunder (WBBL)